Southeast Flavel Street is a light rail station on the MAX Green Line in Portland, Oregon. It is the sixth stop southbound on the I-205 MAX branch. The station is located at SE Flavel Street, adjacent to Interstate 205, and has a center platform. Johnson Creek flows beneath the interstate and railway tracks, slightly north of the station.

Bus line connections
This station is served by the following bus lines:
19 - Woodstock/Glisan

References

External links
Station information (with northbound ID number) from TriMet
Station information (with southbound ID number) from TriMet
MAX Light Rail Stations – more general TriMet page

MAX Light Rail stations
MAX Green Line
Railway stations in the United States opened in 2009
2009 establishments in Oregon
Railway stations in Portland, Oregon